The 40th Street Portal, also known as simply 40th Street station, is a SEPTA Subway-Surface Lines trolley station in Philadelphia. At this station's portal, four of the five Subway-Surface Lines enter the Woodland Avenue subway tunnel after running on the street in Southwest Philadelphia and nearby suburbs. Eastbound trolleys run in the tunnel under the nearby campuses of the University of Pennsylvania and Drexel University to Center City Philadelphia. Westbound trolleys travel to the Philadelphia neighborhoods of Eastwick and Angora and the Delaware County suburbs of Yeadon and Darby.

The station is located above ground at the entrance to the tunnel in a plaza between Woodland Avenue and Baltimore Avenue at 40th Street, adjacent to The Woodlands. When the tunnel is closed, trolleys are re-routed along 42nd Street to terminate at the 40th Street station of the Market–Frankford Line and do not serve this station.

History 

The portal station was opened October 15, 1955 eastbound and westbound opened November 6, 1955 by the Philadelphia Transportation Company (PTC) as part of a larger project to move portions of the elevated Market Street Line and surface trolleys underground.

The original project to bury the elevated tracks between 23rd to 46th streets was announced by the PTC's predecessor, the Philadelphia Rapid Transit Company (PRT), in the 1920s, but was delayed due to the Great Depression and World War II. The PTC's revised project also included a new tunnel for trolleys underneath the campus of the University of Pennsylvania, continuing from the original western portal at 23rd and Market streets to two new portals, the other being at 36th and Ludlow Streets for Route 10.

When constructed, the 40th Street Portal layout can out to a “T” shape (seen in the picture above) with 40th Street crossing directly in front of the mouth of the portal. This lack use of turning trolley around for emergencies and schedule adjustments and propose a danger for motorists who would often mistake the traffic light at the trolley portal mouth as Woodland Avenue and would sometimes turn into the subway tunnel causing delays. So in 1983, the configuration was revised and turnaround loop was constructed and 40th Street was removed from crossing directly in front.

However, service to the vicinity of 40th Street, Woodland Avenue, and Baltimore Avenue has existed long before then. Routes 11, 13, and 36 operated from their current outer termini of Darby and Eastwick to Front Street in Center City beginning December 15, 1906.

Trolley Portal Gardens 
In 2012, the University City District began a plan to overhaul the 40th street portal. The plan included replacing asphalt with green space and landscaping, benches, bike racks, new lighting, and a cafe fronting Baltimore Avenue. The University City District raised $2.1 million for the project. Groundbreaking was in December 2016, but construction did not start until June 2017. The 40th Street Trolley Portal Gardens officially opened to the public on September 27, 2018. In August 2021, the garden was cleared by University City District due to overgrowth obstructing visibility for trolley operators and attracting pests. The organization began replanting the garden in September 2021 with a new layout.

Station layout

References

External links 

Woodland Avenue side of the station from Google Maps Street View
Baltimore Avenue side of the station from Google Maps Street View
Images at SubwayNut.com
Images at NYCSubway.org

SEPTA Subway–Surface Trolley Line stations
Railway stations in Philadelphia
Railway stations in the United States opened in 1955
1955 establishments in Pennsylvania